The 24th Army was a military formation of the People's Liberation Army. It was established in February 1949 and finally disbanded circa 2000–2003.

The 24th Corps() was activated in February 1949, which has originally consisted of the 70th Division (now 3rd Guard Division), 71st Division, and 72nd Division. 

In October 1950, the 71st Division detached from the corps and joined the PLAAF.

In July 1952, the 73rd Division detached from the corps to join the 23rd Corps, which was later deployed into North Korea.

The 74th Division joined the corps on August 26, 1952, after the disbandment of the 25th Corps.

In September 1952, the corps, along with its 70th, 72nd, and 74th divisions, were deployed into North Korea as a part of the People's Volunteer Army. The corps originally garrisoned in Wonsan against amphibious threats. In December 1952 it was deployed into the Triangle Hill area,

In October 1955, the corps withdrew from North Korea and redeployed in Beijing-Tianjin-Tangshan area. It was then a part of the Beijing Military Region until its inactivation.

On January 1, 1957, the 74th Division detached from the corps to join the 66th Corps; the 197th Division attached to the corps from the 66th Corps.

In January 1960, the 70th Division was reconstituted into a mechanized division. In April 1960 the corps was redesignated as the 24th Army Corps(). By then the corps was composed of:
70th Army Division
208th Motorized Infantry Regiment
209th Motorized Infantry Regiment (activated on January 25, 1961)
210th Motorized Infantry Regiment
275th Tank Self-Propelled Artillery Regiment
350th Artillery Regiment
Antiaircraft Artillery Regiment
72nd Army Division
214th Regiment
215th Regiment
216th Regiment
351st Artillery Regiment
197th Army Division
589th Regiment
590th Regiment
591st Regiment
577th Artillery Regiment
402nd Tank Self-Propelled Artillery Regiment
127th Artillery Regiment
49th Anti-Aircraft Artillery Regiment

In 1961, the corps absorbed personnel and equipment from the disbanding 575th Artillery Regiment, 195th Army Division, and five battalions from the 592nd and 594th Regiment, 198th Army Division.

In April 1962, the 49th Anti-Aircraft Artillery Regiment was reduced to a battalion. The 402nd Tank Self-Propelled Artillery Regiment of the 197th Army Division was put under direct control by the army corps. 

On October 25, 1964, the 3rd Engineer District of Beijing Military Region was activated by the army corps.

In June 1966, the 70th Army Division detached from the corps and joined the Beijing Guard District. By then the corps was composed of:
72nd Army Division
214th Regiment
215th Regiment
216th Regiment
351st Artillery Regiment
197th Army Division
589th Regiment
590th Regiment
591st Regiment
577th Artillery Regiment
3rd Engineer District of Beijing Military Region
153rd Engineer Regiment
154th Engineer Regiment
155th Engineer Regiment
402nd Tank Self-Propelled Artillery Regiment
127th Artillery Regiment

In September 1968, the 402nd Tank Self-Propelled Artillery Regiment detached from the army corps and joined the 1st Tank Division.

In June 1969, all artillery regiments were stripped with number designations.

In October-November 1969, the army corps exchanged the 74th Division from the 66th Army Corps with its 197th Army Division. In the same month, the 3rd Engineer District of Beijing Military Region was reconstituted as the 71st Army Division.

In December 1969, the 74th Army Division was redesignated as the 70th Army Division. By then the corps was composed of:
70th Army Division
208th Regiment
209th Regiment
210th Regiment
Artillery Regiment
71st Army Division
211st Regiment
212nd Regiment
213rd Regiment
Artillery Regiment
72nd Army Division
214th Regiment
215th Regiment
216th Regiment
Artillery Regiment
Artillery Regiment

In 1976, Anti-Aircraft Artillery Regiment, 24th Army Corps was activated; Tank Regiment, 24th Army Corps was reconstituted from the 2nd Independent Tank Regiment of Beijing Military Region.

In November 1980, the 5th Garrison Division of Beijing Military Region and Independent Division of Hebei Provincial Military District joined the army corps. In March 1983, the 5th Artillery Division was put under the corps' control.

By then the corps was composed of:
70th Army Division
208th Regiment
209th Regiment
210th Regiment
Artillery Regiment
71st Army Division
211st Regiment
212nd Regiment
Artillery Regiment
72nd Army Division
214th Regiment
215th Regiment
216th Regiment
Artillery Regiment
5th Garrison Division of Beijing Military Region
18th Garrison Regiment
19th Garrison Regiment
20th Garrison Regiment
Artillery Regiment
7th Garrison Division of Beijing Military Region
26th Garrison Regiment
27th Garrison Regiment
28th Garrison Regiment
Artillery Regiment
5th Artillery Division
34th Artillery Regiment
35th Artillery Regiment
50th Artillery Regiment
206th Artillery Regiment
Tank Regiment
Artillery Regiment
Anti-Aircraft Artillery Regiment

In 1985, the army corps was reconstituted as the 24th Army(). The 197th Army Division, 608th Anti-Aircraft Artillery Regiment of the 68th Anti-Aircraft Artillery Division, Anti-Aircraft Artillery Regiment of 66th Army Corps, 149th Engineer Regiment of Beijing Military Region attached to the army. The army was then composed of:
70th Infantry Division - a northern motorized infantry division, category A
208th Infantry Regiment
209th Infantry Regiment
210th Infantry Regiment
Tank Regiment - former Tank Regiment, 24th Army Corps
Artillery Regiment
Anti-Aircraft Artillery Regiment - former Tank Regiment, 24th Army Corps
72nd Infantry Division - a northern infantry division, category B
214th Regiment
215th Regiment
216th Regiment
Artillery Regiment
5th Garrison Brigade of Beijing Military Region
7th Garrison Brigade of Beijing Military Region
Artillery Brigade - reduced from the 5th Artillery Division
Anti-Aircraft Artillery Brigade - reorganized from the 608th Anti-Aircraft Artillery Regiment and the Anti-Aircraft Artillery Regiment of 66th Army Corps
Engineer Regiment
Communications Regiment

In 1989, the army participated in the crackdown on protests in Beijing with its 70th Infantry Division, 72nd Infantry Brigade, and the 7th Garrison Brigade.

In 1992, both the 5th and the 7th garrison brigades were disbanded.

In April 1996 the 1st Tank Division joined the army.

In 1998, the 72nd Infantry Division left the army and was reorganized as a reserve formation.

In the early 2000s, Blasko listed the army as consisting of the:
Headquarters, 24th Group Army, Chengde, Hebei
70th Infantry Division
1st Armored Division (Tianjin)
Artillery Brigade, Changli
Anti-Aircraft Artillery Brigade

In 2003 the army was disbanded. 
The 70th Infantry Division was reduced to the 70th Motorized Infantry Brigade to join the 65th Army;
The 1st Armored Division also joined the 65th Army;
The Artillery Brigade, and the Anti-Aircraft Artillery Brigade were disbanded.

Commanders
Yao Baoqian (1983–?)

References

Field armies of the People's Liberation Army
Military units and formations established in 1949